Rafael Bardem Solé (10 January 1889 – 6 November 1972) was a Spanish film and stage actor whose career stretched from the 1940s through the 1960s. He was the husband of Matilde Muñoz Sampedro; the father of Juan Antonio Bardem and Pilar Bardem; and grandfather of Javier Bardem, Carlos Bardem, and Mónica Bardem.

Rafael Bardem died in Madrid in 1972.

Filmography
Bardem has one television appearance; he played Diego's dad in the first episode of Diego de Acevedo.

Film

External links

References

1889 births
1972 deaths
Male actors from Barcelona
Male actors from Madrid
Spanish male film actors
20th-century Spanish male actors
Rafael
Male actors from Catalonia
Male film actors from Catalonia